Bhalwal  (Punjabi and ), is a city and capital of Bhalwal Tehsil of Sargodha District in the centre of the Punjab province of Pakistan. It is the 99th largest city of Pakistan, according to 2017 census. The city of Bhalwal is the headquarters of Bhalwal Tehsil and lies in an agricultural area, close to the M-2 motorway.
Bhalwal is famous for Orange crops of Pakistan

In 2011, Government of Punjab decided to urbanize 154 small cities and towns near Punjab, in the  result of colossal migration of people from small cities to larger cities like Lahore, Rawalpindi, Gujranwala, and Islamabad. The master urbanization plan included Bhalwal, due to sharp increase of migration to larger cities.

References

Populated places in Sargodha District
Sargodha
Cities in Punjab (Pakistan)